The 2011 Women's Four Nations Cup was the third Hockey Four Nations Cup, an international women's field hockey tournament, consisting of a series of test matches. It was held in Germany, from July 12 to 15, 2012, and featured four of the top nations in women's field hockey.

Competition format
The tournament featured the national teams of Argentina, Australia, South Korea, and the hosts, Germany, competing in a round-robin format, with each team playing each other once. Three points will be awarded for a win, one for a draw, and none for a loss.

Officials
The following umpires were appointed by the International Hockey Federation to officiate the tournament:

 Kim Jung-Hee (KOR)
 Michelle Meister (GER)
 Victoria del Olmo (ESP)
 Maricel Sánchez (ARG)
 Kylie Seymour (AUS)

Results
All times are local (Central European Time).

Fixtures

Statistics

Goalscorers

References

External links
Tournament Website

2011
2011 in women's field hockey
field hockey
field hockey